B-P Battioni e Pagani S.p.A. is an Italian manufacturer of forklifts. The company makes diesel and electric forklifts. The company is UNI EN ISO 9002 certified and UNI EN ISO 9001:2000 certified since 2002.

History
The company was created in 1959 in northern Italy. At the beginning the company produced forklifts use in Italy. These vehicles were used in the wood industry for moving wood panels. After ten years the company began to produce vehicles for factories in Italy and Western Europe.

Current models
The capacity of B-P's forklifts are 2,4,5,6 and 7 T(the smallest segment).

4-WAY
QL-T7
QL-T6.5
QL-T6
QL-T5
QL-T4.5
QL-T4

SIDE LOADERS (Diesel and LPG)
HT7UP
HT6UP
HT5KS
HT4KS
HT3.5KU
HT3KU

Publications
This company is listed in Container Contacts: The European Multimodal Guide – 2011 Edition By Storck.

References

External links

Forklift truck manufacturers
Companies based in the Province of Parma
Italian brands